Afro-Ecuadorians or Afroecuatorianos (Spanish), are Ecuadorians of predominantly Sub-Saharan African descent.

History and background

Most Afro-Ecuadorians are the descendants of enslaved Africans who were transported by Spanish slavers to Ecuador from the early 16th century. In 1553, the first enslaved Africans reached Ecuador in Quito when a slave ship heading to Peru was stranded off the Ecuadorian coast. The enslaved Africans escaped and established maroon settlements in Esmeraldas, which became a safe haven as many Africans fleeing slave conditions either escaped to there or were forced to live there. Eventually, they started moving from their traditional homeland and were settling everywhere in Ecuador.

Racism, on an individual basis and societally, such as Mestizaje and Blanqueamiento are deeply ingrained from the Spanish colonial era is still encountered; Afro-Ecuadorians are strongly discriminated against by the mestizo and criollo populations. As a result, along with lack of government funding and low social mobility poverty affects their community more so than the white and mestizo population of Ecuador. After slavery was abolished in 1851, Africans became marginalized in Ecuador, dominated by the plantation owners.

Afro-Ecuadorian people and culture are found primarily in the country's northwest coastal region. The majority of the Afro-Ecuadorian population (70%) are found in the province of Esmeraldas and the Valle del Chota in the Imbabura Province, where they are the majority. They can be also found in significant numbers in Guayaquil, and in Ibarra, where in some neighborhoods, they make up a majority. Many Afro-Ecuadorians have participated in sports, for instance playing with the Ecuador national football team, many of whom hail from Valle del Chota.

Culture

Afro-Ecuadorian culture may be analysed by considering the two main epicenters of historical presence: the province of Esmeraldas, and the Chota Valley. In Equador it is often said that Afro Equadorians live predominantly in warm places like Esmeraldas. Afro-Ecuadorian culture is a result of the Trans-atlantic slave trade. Their culture and its impact on Ecuador has led to many aspects from West and Central Africa cultures being preserved via ordinary acts of resistance and commerce. Examples of these include the use of polyrhythmic techniques, traditional instruments and dances; along with food ways such as the use of crops brought from Africa, like the Plantain and Pigeon pea, and oral traditions and mythology like La Tunda. When women wear their hair as it grows naturally, it is often associated with poverty, which is why successful or upwardly mobile women tended to straighten their hair.

Music

Marimba music is popular from Esmeraldas to the Pacific Region of Colombia. It was considered an Intangible cultural heritage by UNESCO in 2010. It gets its name from the prominent use of marimbas, but is accompanied along with dances, chants, drums and other instruments specific to this region such as the bombo, the cununo and the guasá.

Sometimes this music is played in religious ceremonies, as well as in celebrations and parties. It features call and response chanting along with the music. Some of the rhythms associated with it are currulao, bambuco and andarele.

On the other hand, in the Chota Valley there is bomba music. It can vary from mid tempo to a very fast rhythm. It is usually played with guitars, as well as the main local instrument called bomba, which is a drum, along with a guiro, and sometimes bombos and bongos. A variation of it played by la banda mocha, groups who play bomba with a bombo, guiro and plant leaves to give melody.

Religion
Religious practice among Afro-Ecuadorians is usually Roman Catholic. Catholic worship is distinctive in Esmeraldas, and sometimes is done with marimba

Political framework

Numerous organizations have been established in Ecuador to for Afro-Ecuadorian issues. The Afro-Ecuadorian Development Council (CONDAE). Afro-Ecuadorian Development Corporation (Corporación de Desarrollo Afroecuatoriano, CODAE), institutionalized in 2002, Asociación de Negros Ecuatorianos (ASONE), founded in 1988, Afro-Ecuadorian Institute, founded 1989, the Agustín Delgado Foundation, the Black Community Movement (El Proceso de Comunidades Negras) and The National Confederation of Afro-Ecuadorians (Confederación Nacional Afroecuatoriana, CNA) are amongst some of the institutional frameworks in place in Ecuador. The World Bank has given loans for Afro-Ecuadorian development proposals in Ecuador since 1998, loaning $34 million for related projects between 2003 and 2007, and USAID also monitored the 2006 elections in Ecuador to ensure that Afro-Ecuadorians were not being unfairly underrepresented.

Notable Afro-Ecuadorians

Historical
Alonso de Illescas (1528-1600s), African Maroon leader in Esmeraldas in colonial Ecuador.

María del Tránsito Sorroza, midwife and formerly enslaved woman.
Martina Carrillo (1750-1778), Ecuadorian activist, born enslaved, who fought for the rights of Afro-Ecuadorians.

Politics

Government
Diana Salazar Méndez,  Attorney General of Ecuador
Lucía Sosa, Mayor of Esmeraldas from 2005 to 2013 and 2014 to 2018
Paola Cabezas, First Afro-Ecuadorian presenter of Ecuador TV and politician

Activism
Jaime Hurtado, from Guayaquil; known for fighting for the rights of the working people of Ecuador; founder and leader of the Democratic People's Movement (MPD); assassinated in the winter of 1999

Music
Guillermo Ayoví Erazo, Ecuadorian Marimba player and singer.

Literature
Adalberto Ortiz (1914-2003), poet, diplomat and author.
Nelson Estupiñán Bass (1912-2012), poet and author.

Sports

Boxing
Carlos Andrés Mina, Ecuadorian Light heavyweight boxer
María José Palacios, Ecuadorian women's Olympic lightweight boxer
Érika Pachito, Ecuadorian women's Olympic middleweight boxer

Judo
Carmen Chalá, Ecuadorian Olympic Judoka.
Diana Chalá, Ecuadorian Olympic Judoka.
Vanessa Chalá, Ecuadorian Olympic Judoka.

Discus
Juan José Caicedo, Ecuadorian discus thrower that competed in the 2020 Summer Olympics

Weightlifting
Neisi Dajomes, Gold medalist for women's weightlifting in the 2020 Tokyo Olympics
Tamara Salazar, Silver medalist for women's weightlifting in the 2020 Tokyo Olympics
Angie Palacios, Ecuadorian Olympic weightlifter and sister of Neisi Dajomes
Alexandra Escobar, Ecuadorian Olympic weightlifter
Oliba Nieve, Gold medalist for women's weightlifting in 2007 Pan American Games

Sprinting
Álex Quiñónez, Ecuadorian Olympic sprinter; finalist in 200-meter dash at the 2012 Summer Olympics
Ángela Tenorio, Ecuador Olympic sprinter 
Yuliana Angulo, Ecuadorian Olympic sprinter
Virginia Villalba, Ecuadorian Olympic sprinter

Football
 Abel Casquete
 Adrian Bone
 Alexander Domínguez
 Anderson Julio
Agustin Delgado, Ecuadorian football player hailing from Juncal village; signed a $3.5 million deal with the team from Southampton, England in 2001
 Byron Castillo
 Carlos Gruezo
 Christian Benítez
 Darío Aimar
Sebas Méndez, football player for the Orlando City SC
Alberto Spencer (1937-2006), football player and all-time top scorer of the Copa Libertadores
Antonio Valencia, football player for Manchester United and Ecuador national team
 Arturo Mina
Enner Valencia, football player for Pachuca and Ecuador national team
Brayan Angulo, football player
Michael Arroyo, football player
Gabriel Achilier, football player
Jefferson Lara, football player
Jairo Padilla, football player
Juan Cazares, football player
 Jhojan Julio, football player
Felipe Caicedo, football player
Miller Bolaños, football player
Álex Bolaños, football player
Alexander Bolaños, football player
Moisés Caicedo, football player
Giovanny Espinoza, football player
 Gonzalo Plata
 Janner Corozo
 Joffre Guerron
 Jorge Guagua
 José Cifuentes
 Jose Valencia
 Juan Cazares
 Jaime Ayoví
 Walter Ayoví
 Diego Palacios
 Pervis Estupiñán
 Ángelo Preciado
 Ayrton Preciado
 Fidel Martínez
 Nilson Angulo
 Segundo Castillo
 Gustavo Vallecilla
 Édison Méndez
 Ivan Hurtado
 Juan Carlos Paredes
 Joao Plata
 Renato Ibarra
 Romario Ibarra
 Robert Arboleda
Ulises de la Cruz
 Walter Chalá
 Djorkaeff Reasco
 Néicer Reasco
 Rorys Aragón
 Frickson Erazo
 Maximo Banguera
 Oscar Bagui
 Pedro Velasco

Gallery

See also

Afro-Latin Americans
List of Afro-Latinos

References

External links
Centro Cultural Afroecuatoriano Website with much information on this subject

 
Ecuadorian
Ethnic groups in Ecuador